The World Petroleum Council  (WPC) is a non-advocacy, non-political organisation with charitable status in the U.K. and has accreditation as a Non-Governmental Organization (NGO) from the United Nations. The WPC facilitates an open dialogue around oil, gas, energy and their products and is dedicated to the promotion of their sustainable management for the benefit of all.

WPC has been called "the world’s premier oil, gas and energy forum since 1933." It is widely recognised to "include the most prestigious national energy companies and agencies of the world"

World Petroleum Congress

The premier conference that is organized by the World Petroleum Council is called the World Petroleum Congress. Starting in 1933, the congress was held every four years until 1991, with a 14-year hiatus in between 1937 and 1951 because of World War II. After 1991, it was held every three years until the year 2000. There was a move to have it hosted every two years after the 2000 edition, with Rio de Janeiro hosting one in 2002, but the cycle returned to every three years after that. In order to host a congress, there is a bidding process by interested cities for one in a particular year.

Note: Due to the onset of COVID-19, the 23rd World Petroleum Congress was moved from 2020 to 2021.

Awards

The Dewhurst Award
This award is named for Institute of Petroleum President Thomas Dewhurst (1881-1973), who organized the first World Petroleum Congress in 1933, and is awarded to individuals who have shown "excellence in the petroleum industry."
2021: Daniel_Yergin
2017: Rex Tillerson
2014: Abdullah bin Hamad Al Attiyah
2011: Guilherme De Oliveira Estrella
2008: Ali Al-Naimi
2005: Lord Brown of Madingley
2002: Euan Baird
2000: Pierre Jacquard
1997: Kenneth T. Derr
1994: Sir Peter Holmes
1991: Abdul Rahman Al-Athel

References

External links
 Official website
 Canadian Association Of World Petroleum Council wpccanada.com
 24th World Petroleum Congress 24wpc.com

International energy organizations
International organisations based in London
Petroleum
Organisations based in the City of Westminster
Petroleum industry
Petroleum organizations